Nettie is a feminine given name that is a diminutive form of Annette, Jeanette, Anna and Antonia. Its popularity in the United States has continually declined since its peak in the 1910s and 1920s. Notable people with this name include:

Given name
Nettie Craig Asberry (1865–1968), American educator
Nettie Lee Benson (1905–1993), American librarian
Nettie Sanford Chapin (1830–1901), American teacher, historian, author, newspaper publisher and suffragist
Nettie McKenzie Clapp (1868–1935), American politician
Nettie Crawford, the 1962 Scripps National Spelling Bee champion
Nettie Depp (1874–1932), American education reformer and public official
Nettie Grooss (1905–1977), Dutch sprinter
Nettie Jane Kennedy (1916–2002), American artist
Nettie McBirney (1887–1982), American inventor
Nettie Mayersohn (1926–2020), American politician 
Nettie Metcalf (1859–1945), American poultry farmer
Nettie Leila Michel (1863–1912), American businesswoman, author and magazine editor
Nettie Langston Napier (1861–1938), American activist 
Nettie Nielsen (born 1964), Danish badminton player
Nettie Rosenstein (1890–1980), American fashion designer
Nettie Stevens (1861–1912), American geneticist
Nettie Barcroft Taylor (1914–2016), American librarian
Nettie L. White (c. 1850–1921), American suffragist and stenographer
Nettie Wiebe (born 1949), Canadian professor
Nettie Wild, Canadian filmmaker
Nettie Young (1916–2010), American artist

Nickname/stagename
Nettie Adler (1868–1950), born Henrietta Adler, English politician
Nettie Fowler (1835–1923), nickname of Nancy Fowler McCormick, American philanthropist
Nettie Honeyball, pseudonym of possibly Mary Hutson, English footballer
Nettie Cronise Lutes (1843–1923), nickname of Annette Cronise Lutes, American lawyer
Nettie Parrish Martin (1840–1915), nom de plume of Marie Antoinette Parrish Hough Martin, American writer
Nettie Palmer (1885–1964), nickname of Janet Gertrude Palmer, née Higgins, Australian poet and critic
Nettie Runnals (1885–1980), nickname of Ninetta May Runnals, American academic
Nettie Tobin (1863–1944), nickname of Esther Tobin, American Bahá'í community member

Fictional characters
Nettie Fowler, a character in Carousel (musical)

See also

Nettle (disambiguation)
Nette (disambiguation)
Netti (disambiguation)
Netti Shanker Yadav

Notes

Danish feminine given names
Dutch feminine given names
English feminine given names
Finnish feminine given names
Norwegian feminine given names
Swedish feminine given names